Víctor Manuel Aguado Malvido (born 1 April 1960) is Mexican former football player and manager.

Playing career

In 1987, Aguado signed for Mexican side Leones Negros, helping them win the 1990–91 Copa México, their only major trophy.

Managerial career 
In 2003, he was appointed manager of Guatemala. In 2006, he was appointed manager of América in the Mexican top flight.

References

External links
 

1960 births
Association football goalkeepers
Club América managers
Club León footballers
C.D. Veracruz managers
Expatriate football managers in Guatemala
Guatemala national football team managers
Leones Negros UdeG footballers
Liga MX players
Living people
Mexico international footballers
Mexican football managers
Santos Laguna footballers
Footballers from Mexico City
Mexican footballers